The 1986 Spanish motorcycle Grand Prix was the first round of the 1986 Grand Prix motorcycle racing season. It took place on the weekend of 2–4 May 1986 at the Circuito Permanente del Jarama.

Classification

500 cc

References

Spanish motorcycle Grand Prix
Spanish
Motorcycle
May 1986 sports events in Europe